Ataxia perplexa is a species of beetle in the family Cerambycidae. It was described by Charles Joseph Gahan in 1892. It is known to be from Mexico.

References

Ataxia (beetle)
Beetles described in 1892